Rhynchoconger guppyi is an eel in the family Congridae (conger/garden eels). It was described by John Roxborough Norman in 1925, originally under the genus Congromuraena. It is a marine, tropical eel which is known from the western central Atlantic Ocean, including the Gulf of Mexico, the Caribbean, northern South America and southern Brazil.

References

Congridae
Fish described in 1925